Teop is a language of northern Bougainville, Papua New Guinea.  It falls within the Oceanic languages, a subgrouping of the Austronesian language family. According to Malcolm Ross, Teop belongs to the Nehan-Bougainville family of languages, part of the Northwest Solomonic group of the Meso-Melanesian cluster within the Oceanic languages. Its closest relative is Saposa.

References

External links 
 The Teop sketch grammar
 Paradisec has two collections of Arthur Cappell's materials (AC1, AC2) that include Peop language materials and one collection from Lynne McDonald (NC1)
 Teop DoReCo corpus compiled by Ulrike Mosel. Audio recordings of narrative texts with transcriptions time-aligned at the phone level, translations, and time-aligned morphological annotations.

Northwest Solomonic languages
Languages of Papua New Guinea
Languages of the Autonomous Region of Bougainville